Jacques Larocque is a Canadian saxophonist, arranger, music educator, and university administrator. He has authored and published numerous transcriptions and arrangements for saxophone quartet; some of which have been recorded by ensembles like the Alliage Saxophone Quartet and the American Saxophone Quartet. He has appeared numerous times on CBC Radio as a soloist and chamber musician and has been a soloist with the Montreal Symphony Orchestra, Quebec Symphony Orchestra, and Orchestre symphonique de Trois-Rivières among others.

Larocque studied the saxophone at the Conservatoire de musique du Québec à Montréal with Arthur Romano and Pierre Bourque. In 1967 he was awarded the Prix d'Europe and to this date is the only saxophonist to have received that honour. That prize enabled him to pursue further studies at the Conservatoire de Paris in France.

After returning to Canada, Larocque became a member of the renowned Pierre Bourque Saxophone Quartet in 1971 with whom he spent the next several years touring internationally and recording. From 1971–1990 he served as the director of the Module de musique program at the Université du Québec à Trois-Rivières. He has since taught on the music faculty at the Conservatoire de musique du Québec à Trois-Rivières. In 1995 he founded the saxophone septet Septune of which he remains Artistic Director. He is also the current Music Director of both Saxophone Andran and the trio Zeugma, and is a member of the Saxium Saxophone Quartet.

References

External links 
 

Living people
Conservatoire de Paris alumni
Canadian saxophonists
Male saxophonists
Conservatoire de musique du Québec à Montréal alumni
Academic staff of the Conservatoire de musique du Québec à Trois-Rivières
Academic staff of the Université du Québec à Trois-Rivières
21st-century saxophonists
21st-century Canadian male musicians
Year of birth missing (living people)